Chhapar village is in Charkhi Dadri district, Haryana and its pincode is 127306. It has 1187 households.

References

Villages in Charkhi Dadri district